Astrid Jóhanna Andreasen (born July 31, 1948, in Vestmanna, Faroe Islands) is a Faroese artist, illustrator and postage stamp designer. As a scientific illustrator, she specialises in marine animals.

Andreasen grew up in Vestmanna, as the daughter of Andreas Andreasen (1906–1974), a teacher, and Daniella Andreasen, a housewife. Early in her career she produced illustrations for collections of her father's poetry. From 1968 to 1970 she studied at a vocational school in Kerteminde in Denmark to become a teacher of embroidery. In 1974 she studied to become an occupational therapist in Hellerup. In the 1970s she took a job as a therapist in Tórshavn hospital where she worked with mentally handicapped people, teaching them embroidery and other art forms.

From 1984 to 1986, Andreasen learned illustration and weaving at the Academy of Arts in Århus, and from 1990 to 1991 she specialized in scientific illustration at the Gerlesborg School of Fine Art as well as at the Tjärnö Marine Biological Laboratory.

Andreasen worked from 1999 until 2016 as a scientific illustrator at the National Museum of the Faroe Islands. She has gained international recognition through her illustrations for Postverk Føroya. As an artist she is especially known for her textile art works, which are held by the collection of the National Gallery of the Faroe Islands. Together with her daughter Katrin (born 1971), she produced the altarpiece of the Vestmanna church, a Tree of Life made out of wood and metal.

In 2018, Andreasen was awarded the Faroese Award of honor.

Stamps

Fish

Leafhoppers
Date of issue: 6 February 1995

Raven
Date of issue: 12 June 1995.

Invasion birds

Mushrooms of the Faroes

Invasion Birds '97
Date of issue: 17 February 1997.

Sedentary Birds I

Sedentary Birds II

Molluscs
Date of issue: 11 February 2002

Text on stamps.fo
[ Molluscs]

Art on posters
Date of issue: 14 April 2003

Storm Petrel

Deepwater Fishes

Other works

References

External links 

 Astrid Andreasen's page on mynd.fo
 Green Renaissance: Itchy Fingers, video about Astrid Andreasen, 2019, youtube.com
 Astrid Andreasen: Robbenbaby Halichoerus grypus, Motivarbeitsgemeinschaft Allgemeine Zoologie e.V., 2020 (in German)
 Scientific article by Dorete Bloch with illustrations by Astrid Andreasen, Frødi, 2004
 Listasavn Føroya (Short biography, in Faroese)
 Nordlysid.com - Astrid Andreasen's Corner (Short biography in English, with photos)

1948 births
Living people
People from Vestmanna Municipality
Faroese stamp designers
Women stamp designers
Scientific illustrators
Faroese women artists
Women graphic designers
Embroiderers
Occupational therapists